Indian River Charter High School (IRCHS) is a co-educational charter high school in Vero Beach, Florida. The school operates under charter from the Indian River County School District.

Location
The school is located near the Mueller Campus of the Indian River State College.

References

External links

 School district website

Indian River County School District
Educational institutions established in 1998
High schools in Indian River County, Florida
Public high schools in Florida
1998 establishments in Florida